The House of the Weeping Widow is an architectural landmark in the city of Kyiv, capital of Ukraine, located at 23 Lyuteranska Street.

History
Constructed in 1907 in the early Art Nouveau style by architect Eduard Bradtman, it was commissioned by Serhiy Arshavsky, a wealthy merchant from Poltava, who occupied it before the Bolshevik Revolution. The building kept its first owner's name long afterwards, and even today is sometimes referred to as the Serhiy Arshavskyi Building. Following the revolution it was occupied by the International Group Federation of the Central Committee of Russian Communist Party (Bolshevik).

Currently it is one of the President of Ukraine's official residences, used to house state visitors, among them: U.S. Secretaries of State Madeleine Albright and Condoleezza Rice, and the Presidents of Lithuania and Brazil.

The building earned its nickname because when it rains water pours over the woman's face on the facade, running down her cheeks like tears.

References

Houses completed in 1907
Art Nouveau architecture in Kyiv
Buildings and structures in Kyiv
Official residences in Ukraine
Government buildings in Ukraine
Art Nouveau houses
Houses in Ukraine
Pecherskyi District